GIRP is a 2011 rock-climbing simulator Flash game by Australian game developer Bennett Foddy. It is a sequel to his 2008 game QWOP. GIRP was nominated for the Nuovo award for innovative games at the 2012 Independent Games Festival, but lost out to Daniel Benmergui's Storyteller.

In the game, the player presses keyboard keys assigned to rocks on a wall to flex and ascend its surface. Wired described the game as "masochistically difficult" and "maddeningly compulsive", with the effect of making the player's keyboard similar to the physical skill game of Twister. Foddy designed GIRP to hijack the neurological reward-system by allowing players to set their own achievable goals in the game.

A sanctioned multiplayer version of GIRP intended for festival use was released under the name Mega GIRP by game developer Douglas Wilson.

References

External links
 GIRP on Foddy's official website

2011 video games
 Flash games
 Browser games
Video games developed in Australia
Video game sequels